At least two warships of Japan have been named Ōshio:

, an  launched in 1937 and sunk in 1943.
, a submarine launched in 1964 and struck in 1981.

Japanese Navy ship names